Vogelsang  is a municipality in the Oder-Spree district, in Brandenburg, Germany. It is located near the border with Poland.

Demography

References

Localities in Oder-Spree